Kaliyuga Krishnudu is a 1986 Indian Telugu-language action film, produced by Chalapathi Rao, A. K. V. Prasad in the banner of Viswashanthi Enterprises and directed by K. Murali Mohana Rao. Starring Nandamuri Balakrishna, Radha  and music composed by Chakravarthy. The film was recorded as a Hit at the box office.It ran 100 days in 20 centres and is the 5th Hit in Balakrishna’s double hat trick of 1986.

Plot
The film begins with a business magnate Siddeswara Rao devious and direful person. Gayatri Devi his sister gets back from abroad with her husband Vasudeva Rao and seeks her share of the property which he denies. Moreover, he brutally kills Vasudeva Rao and craftily penal Gayatri. However, she is pregnant at that time and gives birth to a baby boy in the prison. So, Siddeswara Rao instructs his allegiant Sambaiah to eliminate the child too. So, he abducts him when a truck driver Rangaiah rescues and rears him as Mohana Krishna. Frightened Sambaiah announces a kid’s death when Siddeswara Rao backstabs him, anyhow he escapes. In tandem, Siddeswara Rao ridicules Gayatri when she challenges him to wipe out him. 

Years roll by, and Mohana Krishna grows up as a doughty who defies unjust. Being unbeknownst, he becomes diehard to Siddeswara Rao, his roguish son Ramesh, and snobby daughter Anuradha. Meanwhile, Gayatri Devi is released, acquires her share, and declares business warfare against her brother. Destiny makes Rangaiah Gayatri's driver and she associates with Mohana Krishna. Here, they develop strange relations and, on the verge, to collapse their adversary. Then, Anuradha conspires and apprehends Mohana Krishna under a trumped-up charge. Hence, he ripostes by marrying her in disguise. Soon after, Mohana Krishna reveals his identity. Consequently, infuriated Anuradha tries to kill Gayatri Devi when she learns the devilish side of her father. Therefore, Anuradha reforms and unites with her husband. 

After a while, Rangaiah identifies Sambaiah, hard to hold him but he goes into the clutches of Siddeswara Rao. Discovering the actuality, Siddeswara Rao intrigues by goading Mohana Krishna with his mother through Sambaiah with a fairytale. Despite that truth comes forward which conjoins Mohana Krishna & Gayatri Devi. Knowing it, begrudge Ramesh's moves for vengeance against Sambaiah. He tries to molest his daughter Lakshmi when by mistake Sambaiah kills her. At that juncture, Mohana Krishna plays the same old trick and indicts Ramesh. Thus, Siddeswara Rao breaks the bars and absconds his son. At last, Mohana Krishna ceases them. Finally, the movie ends on a happy note.

Cast

Nandamuri Balakrishna as Mohana Krishna
Radha as Anuradha
Rao Gopal Rao as Siddaswara Rao
Sharada as Gayatri Devi 
Allu Ramalingaiah as Kukuteswara Rao / Kuku
Nutan Prasad as Rangaiah
Gollapudi Maruthi Rao as Sambaiah
Sudhakar as Ramesh
Ranganath as Vasudeva Rao
Sakshi Ranga Rao as Pakir
Jaya Bhaskar as Police Inspector
Jagga Rao  
K. K. Sarma as Someswara Rao
Chidatala Appa Rao 
Potti Veeraiyah 
Dham
Rama Prabha as Rangamma
Madhuri as Lakshmi
Anitha as Vijaya
Kuali as item number
Jayamalini as item number
Anuradha as item number

Soundtrack

Music composed by Chakravarthy. Lyrics were written by Veturi. The music released on the LEO Audio Company.

References

1986 films
Films scored by K. Chakravarthy
1980s Telugu-language films